The 1915 Scarborough by-election was held on 9 February 1915.  The by-election was held due to the incumbent Liberal MP, Walter Rea, becoming Lord Commissioner of the Treasury.  It was retained by Rea, who was unopposed due to the war-time electoral pact.

References

1915 in England
Politics of the Borough of Scarborough
1915 elections in the United Kingdom
By-elections to the Parliament of the United Kingdom in North Yorkshire constituencies
1910s in Yorkshire
Unopposed ministerial by-elections to the Parliament of the United Kingdom
February 1915 events